BJH or bjh may refer to:

 Barclay James Harvest, an English progressive rock band
 BJH, the IATA code for Bajhang Airport, Sudurpashchim Province, Nepal
 bjh, the ISO 639-3 code for Bahinemo language, East Sepik Province, Papua New Guinea